This is a list of Texas Longhorns men's basketball players selected in the NBA draft.

Key

† = Currently active in the NBA‡ = Currently active in the NBA G League

Position key

Draft selections
Here’s the list of players that were drafted in the NBA Draft.

Draft selections by team

Awards, honors, and achievements from draft selections

NBA Champions and postseason

NBA All-Star selections

NBA regular season awards

NBA regular season stat leaders

Retired and honored numbers

NBA 75th Anniversary Team

References

 
Texas Longhorns
Texas Longhorns NBA Draft